The Lorraine Park Cemetery Gate Lodge is a historic gatehouse located near Woodlawn, Baltimore County, Maryland, United States. It is a -story, Queen Anne–style stone-and-frame building designed by Baltimore architect Henry F. Brauns that was constructed in 1884. Adjacent to the house are the ornate cast-iron and wrought-iron Lorraine Cemetery gates.

The Lorraine Park Cemetery Gate Lodge was listed on the National Register of Historic Places in 1985.

References

External links
, including photo from 1984, at Maryland Historical Trust

Houses completed in 1884
Houses in Baltimore County, Maryland
Gates in the United States
Houses on the National Register of Historic Places in Maryland
Queen Anne architecture in Maryland
Gatehouses (architecture)
National Register of Historic Places in Baltimore County, Maryland